Games in the mancala family include:

Popular games 

The most widely played games are probably:
Bao is a complex strategy game of Kenya and Zanzibar, played on a 4×8 board.
Kalah is the ruleset usually included with commercially available boards; however, the game is heavily biased towards the first player, and it is often considered a children's game. The board is 2×6 with stores. The Pie rule can be used to balance the first-player's advantage.
Oware, the national game of Ghana, is also known by Warri, Ayo (Yoruba Name. Nigeria), Awele, Awari, Ouril, and other names. It has relatively simple rules but considerable strategic depth. The board is 2×6 (not counting optional stores).
Omweso (also known as coro) is a strategic game of Uganda, played on a 4×8 board.
Pallanguzhi is played in Tamil nadu, Southern India with 2 x 7 stores. Two varieties of this game are popular, Kaashi and Bank.

Games with unusual features 
Bohnenspiel is a German mancala based on a Persian game not unlike some African mancala variants. The board is 2×6 with 2 stores.
ǁHus is a Namibian game. The board is 4×8.

Modern adaptations 
Bantumi, featured on many early Nokia phones such as the Nokia 3310
Conga (Martin Franke; Germany)
Cups (Arthur Amberstone and Wald Amberstone; United States: New York)
Devil Bunny Hates the Earth, where you try to save the world by jamming taffy machines. (James Ernest and Cheapass Games; United States: Seattle, Washington)
Oh-Wah-Ree is a commercial variant of Oware with provision for more than two players.
55Stones is a modern mancala game with simultaneous moves.
Kauri is a modern mancala game with two kinds of seeds.
Mangala (Serdar Asaf Ceyhan; Turkey)
Space Walk is a modern boardgame with mancala mechanic.
Trajan is a modern boardgame variant with mancala mechanic.
Five Tribes is a modern boardgame variant with mancala mechanic.

Traditional variants 

Abangah (the Azande of Sudan) The board is 2×8 with stores.
Adji-boto (Suriname)
Agsinnoninka (Philippines)
Alemungula (Ethiopia and Sudan)
Ali Guli Mane (India—Karnataka)
Andada (Kunama of Eritrea)
Anywoli (Ethiopia, Sudan)
Aw-li On-nam Ot-tjin (Borneo)
Aweet (Sudan, Namibia)
Ayoayo (Yoruba of Nigeria)
Ba-awa (Ghana) The board is 2×6 with stores.
Bajangkaq (Sumatra)
Bāqūra (Mesopotamia)
Bay Khom (Cambodia)
Bau (the Wa Chaga)
Beatta (Tayma)
Bohnenspiel (Germany)
Chenna Maaney (In Tulu language, South India)
Chisolo (Zambia)
Chonka (Borneo)
Chongka, or Tchonka (Marianas)
Choro
Chuncajon (Philippines)
Congkak (Indonesia, Malaysia) The board is 2×7 with stores.
Coro (Lango region of Uganda)
Dakon (Java island of Indonesia)
Dara-dara (Indonesia—Sulawesi)
Daramutu (Sri Lanka)
Ellaewala-kanda (Sri Lanka)
El Arnab (Kababish of Sudan)
En Gehé (Maasai of Tanzania)
Endodoi (Maasai of Kenya and Tanzania)
Enkeshui (Maasai of Kenya and Tanzania)
Eson xorgol (Kazakhs of Western Mongolia)
Gabata (Ethiopia)
Galatjang (Sulawesi)
Giuthi (Kikuyu of Kenya)
Göçürme (Turkey)
Halusa (Mesopotamia)
Hawalis (Oman)
Hoyito (Dominican Republic)
Igisoro (Rwanda - Burundi)
Ingilith (the Turkana of Kenya)
Isafu
Isafuba
Isolo (Sukuma of Tanzania)
J'erin (Nigeria)

Kakumei (Japan)
Kale (Gabon)
Kaloleh (Sumatra)
Kapo (Senegal)
Kanji guti (India—Odisha)
Katro (Betsileo  of Madagascar)
Khutka boia (India—Punjab)
Kiela (Angola)
Kiothi (Meru of Kenya)
Kisolo (also spelled Chisolo) (DR Congo and Zimbabwe)
Kotu-baendum (Sri Lanka)
Kombe (Kenya)
Köçürme (Kırgızistan)
Krur (Hassaniya of Western Sahara)
Kubuguza
La'b Madjnuni (Syria)
La'b Hakimi, or La'b Akila (Syria)
La'b Roseya (Syria)
Lamlameta (Konso people of Ethiopia)
Latho (Dorzé of Ethiopia)
Layli Goobalay (Somalia)
Li'b al-ghashim
Longbeu-a-cha (India—Assam)
Lontu-Holo (the Maroon of Suriname)
Madji (the Benni of Nigeria)
Main chakot (Thailand)
Mak Khom (Thailand)
Makonn (Seychelles)
Mancala'h (Egypt, Syria)
Mandoli (Greece— Hydra)
Mangala (Egypt, Turkey - different rules)
Matoe (Indonesia—Sumba)
Mawkar katiya (India—Assam)
Mbau (Kenya— Kilimanjaro region of the Rift Valley)
Mbothe (Pokomo people of Kenya)
Mechiwa (Bali)
Mefuvha
Melegayası (Turkey) The board is 2×9 with stores.
Mereköçdü (Azerbaijan) The board is a circle of six holes. Each player has 21 stones.
Meuchoh (Sumatra—Aceh)
Meulieh (Sumatra—Aceh)
Meusueb (Sumatra—Aceh)
Meuta' (Sumatra—Aceh)
Minkale (Bin Kale) (Turkey)
Mongale (Kenya)
Mongola (Congo, Rwanda)
Naranj (Maldives)
Nsolo (Zambia)
Ô ăn quan (Viet Nam) game is 2 mandarin boxes x5 ponds each, with 25 stones or tamarind seeds each
Obridjie  (Nigeria)
Ouril (Cape Verde)
Oh’valhu-gondi (Maldives) 2 players play with cowrie shells.
Pachgarhwa (India)
Pallanguzhi (Tamil of India), also known as Pallankuli.
Pereauni (Uganda)
Poo (Liberia)
Puhulmuti (Sri Lanka)
Sai (Flores)
Sat-gol (India)
Songo
Sungka (Philippines)
Til-guti (India)
Tsoro ((Zimbabwe)
Toee (Sudan)
Togyzkumalak (Kazakhstan) 
Toguz korgool (Kyrgyzstan)  The board is 2×9 with stores.
Ünee tugalluulakh (Kazakhs of Mongolia)
Vaamana Guntalu (Telugu name, India - Andhra Pradesh)
Vai Lung Thlan (the Mizo in Mizoram, India)
Walak-pussa (Sri Lanka)
Warra (United States)
Wa-wee (Saint Lucia)
散窯 (Sàn yáo) (China—Henan)
老牛棋 (Lǎo niú qí) (China—Anhui)
分六煲棋 (Fēn liù bāo qí) (China—Guangdong)

Notes

References
H. J. R. Murray, History of Board Games other than Chess (1952)
Laurence Russ, Mancala games (1984)
H. J. Braunholtz, The Game of Mweso in Uganda., Man. Vol. 31. (July 1931), pp. 121–122.
Arslan Küçükyıldız, Köçürme / Mangala, Ankara, Delta (2015)

External links 
The Game of Igisoro, or Omweso, in East Africa
Oware/Awale and other Mancala games - an informative page

Lists of games